Breese is a surname. Notable people with the surname include:

Charles Breese (1889–1941), English naval and air force officer
Charles Breese (1867–1932), Welsh solicitor, antiquarian and politician
Chic Breese (1872–1929), Australian rules footballer
Dave Breese (1926–2002), American evangelist
Dilys Breese (1932–2007), English television producer
Edward Y. Breese (1912–1979), American writer
Gareth Breese (born 1976), Jamaican cricketer
Kidder Breese (1831–1881), American naval officer
Llywelyn Breese (fl. 1870s), American politician
Quentin Breese (1918–1962), American boxer
Samuel Livingston Breese (1794–1870), American rear-admiral
Sidney Breese (1800–1878), American politician and lawyer
Vance Breese (1904–1973), American aviation engineer and test pilot

See also
Drew Brees, American football player